The Six Best Cellars is a lost 1920 American silent comedy film directed by Donald Crisp and starring Bryant Washburn and Wanda Hawley. It was produced by Famous Players-Lasky and distributed by Paramount Pictures.

It was based on the 1919 novel The Six Best Cellars by Holworthy Hall, the pseudonym of Harold Everett Porter. The film was released just after prohibition in the United States went into effect on January 17, 1920.

Plot
As described in a film magazine, Henry Carpenter (Washburn) finds his supply of liquor getting low and the price far too prohibitive once national prohibition goes into effect. At the same time, the social set to which he and his wife Millicent (Hawley) belong find liquor indispensable at dinner. An experiment in home brewing meets little success and the Carpenters are in danger of losing their social position when their set picks up with an ex-saloon keeper, who has a cellar full of choice liquors. Millicent's aunt finds four cases of what appears to be liquor in her cellar and turns it over to Henry to destroy. He immediately invites the set over to a big dinner, announcing that he has an abundance of wine. The guests arrive when he discovers that the cases contain "empties." To save the situation, he denounces liquor and says that he had decided not to serve any. Henry immediately becomes a "dry" hero, is made vestryman at the church and a bank director, and is asked to run for Congress. Then his wife's aunt calls again, reporting that she has found twenty-four full and genuine cases. Henry debates whether to return to his social set with the liquor or remain the dry champion with a chance to go to Washington. The film ends as he faces the audience and asks, "What would you do?"

Cast
Bryant Washburn as Henry Carpenter
Wanda Hawley as Millicent Carpenter
Clarence Burton as Ed Hammond
Elsa Lorimer as Mrs. Hammond
Josephine Crowell as Mrs. Teak
Frederick Vroom as Mr. Teak
Jane Wolfe as Virginia Jasper
Richard Wayne as H. Sturtevant Jordan
Julia Faye as Mrs. Jordan
Howard Gaye as Tommy Blair
Zelma Maja as Mrs. Blair
J. Parker McConnell as Harris (credited as Parker MacConnell)
Ruth Ashby as Mrs. Harris
Allen Connor as McAllister (credited as Allan Connor)
Lorie Larson as Mrs. McAllister

References

External links

1920 films
American silent feature films
Lost American films
Paramount Pictures films
Films directed by Donald Crisp
1920 comedy films
Silent American comedy films
American black-and-white films
1920 lost films
Lost comedy films
1920s American films
1920s English-language films
English-language comedy films